Juhani Tyrväinen (born 11 September 1990) is a Finnish professional ice hockey forward who currently plays for Luleå HF in the Swedish Hockey League (SHL).

Playing career
Tyrväinen played at the junior level with the Lahti Pelicans, he made his professional debut with the Pelicans in the SM-liiga during the 2010–11 season.

Following his ninth season in the Liiga in 2018–19, Tyrväinen left HIFK and opted to move to the SHL as a free agent, signing a two-year contract with Luleå HF on 23 April 2019.

Juhani's brother Antti Tyrväinen also plays professionally with the Lahti Pelicans.

References

External links

1990 births
Living people
Finnish ice hockey forwards
HIFK (ice hockey) players
Jokerit players
Kiekko-Vantaa players
Lahti Pelicans players
People from Seinäjoki
Sportspeople from South Ostrobothnia